Adriano Inàcio da Matta (born 12 July 1988) is a Brazilian footballer.

He is the author of the assist to Wendell Lira's goal, Puskás' award winner in 2015.

References

External links

1988 births
Living people
Footballers from São Paulo
Brazilian footballers
Brazilian expatriate footballers
Esporte Clube Vitória players
Marília Atlético Clube players
A.C. Monza players
Expatriate footballers in Italy
Association football midfielders
Esporte Clube Jacuipense players
Goianésia Esporte Clube players
Luverdense Esporte Clube players
Associação Atlética Aparecidense players
Oeste Futebol Clube players
Corumbaense Futebol Clube players